Fairfield is a town in Teton County, Montana, United States. The population was 759 at the 2020 census.

Fairfield began as a station on the Milwaukee and is between Great Falls and Choteau and near Freezeout Lake, (from Cheney's Names on the Face of Montana, Mountain Press Publishing Company) where as many as 300,000 snow geese and 10,000 tundra swans gather in March. Fairfield serves as a trading center for the farmers of Greenfield Bench. Irrigation now assures crops, but in earlier days a dry summer made the grass scarce and the name "Freeze-out Bench" was applied to the area. "Greenfield Bench" and Fairfield are now descriptive of the hay and grain fields surrounding the town.

Even though the federal government had opened this area of Montana to homesteading in 1862, not until 1909 did settlers really come into the Fairfield area when Congress liberalized this act allowing the settler 320 acres of free land instead of 160. It became apparent, however, that the small homesteads, 160 or 320 acres, made little sense in the vast and dry landscape of Montana. After the Bureau of Reclamation conducted a survey that showed a dam could be built in the Sun River Canyon and water for irrigation in Fairfield area would be feasible were many more settlers attracted to Fairfield. The Gibson Dam was completed in 1929. Today, Greenfield Irrigation District delivers water from Gibson Dam to approximately 83,000 acres surrounding this community.

Fairfield is nicknamed the "Malting Barley Capital of the World", a trade center for the farming community as well as being home to Busch Agricultural Resources, 3 Rivers Telephone Cooperative and Sun River Electric Cooperative.

Geography
Fairfield is located at  (47.615250, -111.980859).

Demographics

2010 census
As of the census of 2010, there were 708 people, 305 households, and 204 families residing in the town. The racial makeup of the town was 95.9% White, 1.3% Native American, and 2.8% from two or more races. Hispanic or Latino of any race were 1.4% of the population.

There were 305 households, of which 30.2% had children under the age of 18 living with them, 54.4% were married couples living together, 9.8% had a female householder with no husband present, 2.6% had a male householder with no wife present, and 33.1% were non-families. 30.8% of all households were made up of individuals, and 15.8% had someone living alone who was 65 years of age or older. The average household size was 2.32 and the average family size was 2.91.

The median age in the town was 42.1 years. 27% of residents were under the age of 18; 3.7% were between the ages of 18 and 24; 22% were from 25 to 44; 26% were from 45 to 64; and 21.2% were 65 years of age or older. The gender makeup of the town was 46.9% male and 53.1% female.

2000 census
As of the census of 2000, there were 659 people, 285 households, and 184 families residing in the town. The population density was 2,170.7 people per square mile (848.1/km2). There were 311 housing units at an average density of 1,024.4 per square mile (400.3/km2). The racial makeup of the town was 96.97% White, 0.91% Native American, 0.15% from other races, and 1.97% from two or more races. Hispanic or Latino of any race were 0.91% of the population.

There were 285 households, out of which 31.2% had children under the age of 18 living with them, 53.3% were married couples living together, 8.4% had a female householder with no husband present, and 35.4% were non-families. 32.3% of all households were made up of individuals, and 15.8% had someone living alone who was 65 years of age or older. The average household size was 2.31 and the average family size was 2.95.

In the town, the population was spread out, with 25.6% under the age of 18, 9.4% from 18 to 24, 28.5% from 25 to 44, 18.5% from 45 to 64, and 17.9% who were 65 years of age or older. The median age was 37 years. For every 100 females there were 95.5 males. For every 100 females age 18 and over, there were 92.2 males.

The median income for a household in the town was $29,018, and the median income for a family was $34,896. Males had a median income of $28,750 versus $18,125 for females. The per capita income for the town was $15,255. About 7.7% of families and 11.3% of the population were below the poverty line, including 17.0% of those under age 18 and 7.9% of those age 65 or over.

Education

Public schools 
Fairfield Public Schools serves grades K-12. In 2019, Fairfield Elementary was one of three Montana schools selected by the U.S. Department of Education to receive the National Blue Ribbon School award. That same year, the state honored Fairfield Superintendent Les Meyer as Superintendent of the Year.

From 2010-2015, the high school girls' basketball team, coached by Dustin Gordon, collected 120 consecutive wins solidifying one of the longest winning streaks for a high school girls' basketball team in the United States. Fairfield High School's team name is the Eagles.

Private schools 
There is a private Mennonite school in Fairfield.

Libraries 
Fairfield has a public library operated in a joint city-county arrangement.

News organizations 
The Fairfield Sun Times is a weekly newspaper that has been in operation, under various names, since the town's founding.

Climate
According to the Köppen Climate Classification system, Fairfield has a semi-arid climate, abbreviated "BSk" on climate maps.

On December 14, 1924, Fairfield set the record for the largest 12-hour temperature drop in the United States when it went from 63 degrees at noon to minus 21 degrees at midnight.

Notable person

 Gordon McOmber, Montana Lieutenant Governor, 1988-1989

References

External links
 Fairfield Chamber of Commerce website
 Fairfield Sun Times Newspaper Website
 Visit Fairfield, MT Website 

Towns in Teton County, Montana